Arresting Gena is a 1997 American independent drama film directed by Hannah Weyer. It premiered in competition at the 1997 Sundance Film Festival.

Premise
During the summer before her senior year of high school, 16-year-old Gena's life is abruptly changed when her mother falls into a coma and is put in the hospital. In the meantime, she goes to live with her Uncle John, whom she does not have much of a relationship with. She meets Jane, a charismatic runaway, and the two become friends. Gena is drawn into Jane's world, which includes Gena's older brother Sonny, who is also a petty criminal. Soon the girls find themselves caught up in Sonny's dealing with a local gang leader, Sugar.

Cast

Production
Director Hannah Weyer attracted attention in 1995 with her New York University MFA thesis film, The Salesman and Other Adventures, which won the Best Short prize at the Sundance Film Festival in 1995. Following this, she began work on Arresting Gena, with the intention of screening it at Sundance. The script was workshopped at the Sundance Filmmakers' Lab in June 1995.

Actress Aesha Waks was cast in the lead role following a two-month video submission audition process. Filming occurred in New Jersey.

Reception
The film was expected to perform well at Sundance, with Filmmaker commenting it had "a nuanced script [that] explores the obsessive devotion of teenage girls and the societal pressures that pull them apart. Its locale feels genuine and the work seems to come from an honest emotional place." However, it received a mixed reaction at the festival and was not able to secure a distribution deal. 

In a Variety review, critic Emanuel Levy described Arresting Gena as a "frustrating, misconceived effort to illuminate the painful coming of age of its protagonist, a sensitive girl unwillingly pushed into a sleazy world of crime." Levy said the film's "most congenial scenes, which enjoy only brief screen time, are those depicting Gena’s romantic and sexual awakening. There are also some achingly touching moments in the interactions between Jane and Sonny, siblings realizing they can neither help nor rely on each other," but said, "lacking a third act, [the film] has an abrupt, unsatisfying denouement", and that "Gena's character remains an enigma."

In contrast, Lisa Alspector of the Chicago Reader wrote, "Writer-director Hannah Weyer keeps control of the extreme scenes...by being convincing with the quieter ones, and we get to know Gena well enough to accept the shifts in tone when she and Jane tangle with an undercover police officer or when she confronts Sonny after Jane disappears." Alspector concluded, "Weyer’s portrait makes believable and comprehensible some apparently self-destructive things this teenager does in pursuit of thrills and emotional connections.

References

External links 
 
 

1997 films
1997 drama films
Films shot in New Jersey
1997 independent films
Teen crime films
Films about runaways
1990s gang films
Films about siblings
1990s coming-of-age drama films
1990s female buddy films
American drama films
1990s drama films
1990s English-language films
1990s American films